J&T is a Central European investment group founded in 1993 in Slovakia. It operates in the private equity and banking sectors, the largest portion of the value of its investments being in the Czech Republic and Slovakia. J&T invests mainly into the financial services, energy sector, real estate, health care, media and sports. Together with the Penta Group, it is the biggest investment group in Slovakia. In 2010, J&T Finance Group achieved a net profit of €85.0 million (down from €116.0 million in 2009) and total consolidated equity of €729 million. The group’s assets amounted to €3.8 billion and an additional €1.6 billion was managed through asset management services provided to the group’s clients, ranking J&T among the top financial investors in Central and Eastern Europe.

In the Czech Republic, J&T was the subject of the Tuscany Affair. The name of the company is derived from the family names of its two founders Ivan Jakabovič and Patrik Tkáč. President of the J&T Group is Jozef Tkáč.

History 
J&T was founded in 1993 in Slovakia by Ivan Jakabovič and Patrik Tkáč, both former classmates. Their first major project was the development of luxury housing on Drotárska Street in Bratislava, Slovakia. An important milestone for the young company was the purchase of investment fund Creditanstalt IF in 1996. Today, the company specializes in the Czech Republic, Slovakia and Russia, but the group also invests in the markets of Switzerland, Canada, Mexico and the Caribbean.

Business model 
J&T is a multinational holding with its parent company, Techno plus, headquartered in the Slovak Republic. The core company of the holding is J&T Finance Group with base capital of 1 billion Slovak crowns.

Ownership portfolio

Banking and financial services 
 J&T Banka, in the Czech Republic ( general director Stepan Aser
 J&T Banka, branch of a foreign bank in Slovakia
 J&T Bank ZAO, in Russia
 J&T Bank and Trust, in Barbados
 Poštová banka, in Slovakia (majority shareholder)

Energy, industry and infrastructure  
 Energetický a průmyslový holding (EPH), a vertically integrated energy conglomerate consisting of more than 30 entities active in all major parts of the energy chain (e.g. mining, heat and electricity generation, commodities trading). It is the largest supplier of heat in the Czech Republic, the second largest electricity producer in the Czech Republic and the third largest mining company in Germany. J&T Finance Group funds Limited Partnerships which owns a minority stake.
 EP Industries, a major Czech industrial holding focused on energy engineering, transport infrastructure and automotive industries. J&T Finance Group owns a minority stake.
 Unipetrol, a major Central European refinery and petrochemical group operating refineries, plants and a network of 355 petrol stations. J&T Finance group owns a minority stake.

Real Estate 
 J&T Real Estate
 CEETA (minority shareholder)

Tourism and leisure 
 Tatry Mountain Resorts (minority shareholder)
 Best Hotel Properties (minority shareholder)
 ABS Jets

Entertainment 
 JOJ Media House, operator of TV JOJ in Slovakia
 AC Sparta Praha football club in the Czech Republic

See also 
 Economy of Slovakia
 Penta (investment group)
 Privatization in Slovakia

References

External links 
 J&T Board of Directors

Companies based in Bratislava
Investment companies of Slovakia
Financial services companies established in 1993